Jiso is a village on the Zanzibari island of Pemba. It is located in the far north of the island, 12 kilometres north of Wete.

References
Finke, J. (2006) The Rough Guide to Zanzibar (2nd edition). New York: Rough Guides.

Villages in Zanzibar
Pemba Island